USS LST-921 was an  in the United States Navy. Like many of her class, she was not named and is properly referred to by her hull designation.

Construction
LST-921 was laid down on 1 May 1944, at Hingham, Massachusetts, by the Bethlehem-Hingham Shipyard; launched on 2 June 1944;  and commissioned on 23 June 1944.

Service history
She was struck by one torpedo on her aft port side which broke the stern off. Two officers, along with 41 enlisted men, were lost, with the survivors being picked up by her sister ship  and the British   . The bow section was towed to port and stripped prior to decommissioning and disposal of the hulk. The ship was decommissioned on 29 September 1944, and struck from the Navy list on 14 October 1944. Her hulk was later used as a floating machine ship for the US Army in Antwerp, Belgium.

Notes

Citations

Bibliography 

Online resources

External links
 

 

LST-542-class tank landing ships
World War II amphibious warfare vessels of the United States
Ships built in Hingham, Massachusetts
1944 ships
World War II shipwrecks in the English Channel